Graphium megarus, the spotted zebra, is a species of swallowtail butterfly found in Southeast Asia. It is common and not considered to be threatened; however, the nominate subspecies is protected by law in India.

Description

Male upperside black with the following white streaks and spots. Forewing cell with a small spot at base followed by three obliquely transverse streaks in middle, none extended to either the subcostal or median veins, and two spots near apex; single slender narrow streaks in interspaces la and 2, and two streaks in interspace 1; above these a spot at base followed by a streak in each of the interspaces 3, 4, 6 and 8, an outer spot only in interspace 5, and a basal spot in interspace 7; finally, a complete series of small subterminal spots. Hindwing: a streak in cell with a spot above its outer apex; a streak followed by a spot in each of the interspaces 1, 6 and 7; three elongate spots in interspaces 2 and 3 and two in interspaces 4 and 5; finally, a series of four slender subterminal lunules in interspaces 2 to 5. Underside similar, with similar but slightly broader markings. Female similar, ground colour duller, more fuliginous black; markings similar, on the forewing slightly broader, on the hindwing slightly narrower, than in the male.

Subspecies
 G. m. megarus
 G. m. megapenthes
 G. m. sagittiger
 G. m. fleximacula
 G. m. marthae
 G. m. tiomanensis

See also

Papilionidae
List of butterflies of India
List of butterflies of India (Papilionidae)

References

Pathysa
Butterflies of Asia
Butterflies of Indochina
Butterflies described in 1841